Jyotisar, on the bank of Jyotisar Sarovar wetland, is a Hindu pilgrimage site in the city of Kurukshetra in Haryana state of India. In mythology, it is where Krishna delivered the sermon of Bhagavad Gita - the doctrine of Karma and Dharma to his wavering friend Arjun to guide him to resolve his ethical dilemma. and revealed his virat rupa (universal form) to him.

It lies west of Kurukshetra city on SH-6 state highway.

Background

Etymology

'Jyoti' means the light or enlightenment in this context. 'Sar' means the core. Hence, 'Jyotisar' means 'core meaning of light' or 'ultimately of God' i.e. the 'essence of enlightenment'.

Association with Mahabharta 

According to mythology Krishna gave a sermon to Arjuna at Jyotisar, during which Bhagvad Gita was revealed, under a vat vriksh (banyan tree), a sacred tree in Indian-origin religions such as Hinduism, Buddhism, Jainism and Sikhism. A banyan tree which local tradition says is an offshoot of the tree Krishna preached under stands on a raised plinth at Jyotisar.

There is also an old Shiv temple here where Kauravas and Pandavas had worshiped Shiva. Abhimanyupur and Harsh Ka Tila, archaeological finds, are nearby. The Dharohar Museum, Kurukshetra Panorama and Science Centre, and Shrikrishna Museum are also in Kurukshetra.

Jyotisar religious heritage tourism project

Jyotisar tirth was renovated and continuously being upgraded by the Kurukshetra Development Board. Krishna Circuit Kurukshetra development project is jointly undertaken by the Government of Haryana and India's Ministry of culture, which entails development of several other sites in and around Kurukshetra including Brahma Sarovar, Sannihit Sarovar, Narkatari Baan Ganga, Abhimanyu Ka Tila and Mahabharata themed park, etc. Phase-I entails Bhagwat Gita and Mahabharta museum, statues, and development of various trithas in 4 kos ki Kurukshetra prikrama, etc. Phase 2 entails broadening of revived saraswati river from Pipli to Jyotisar.

As part of the National Krishna Yatra circuit, 48 Kos Kurukshetra and 134 pilgrimage sites within it are being developed along the lines of the Braj Kosi Yatra. Under this national project, Union Government of India and respective state governments are also constructing two mega temples of Lord Krishna, at Vrindavan on 65 acres with a cost of Rs 800 crores (US120 million) and at Bangalore with a cost of Rs 700 crores (US105 million).

Mahabharata light and sound show 

A daily light and music laser show is organized by the tourism department at the Jyotisar lake, which recreates episodes from the Hindu epic Mahabharata.

Bhagavad Gita and Mahabharata museum 

The project includes the hi-tech digital and virtual reality Bhagavad Gita and Mahabharata theme museum at Jyotisar, with a 100,000 sq feet new constructed area which will cater for 10,000 pilgrims expected every day.

To promote international religious tourism, this Mahabharata and Sri Krishna heritage theme project entails construction of 8 buildings on the bank of ancient Jyotisar lake. Each building, 4 to 5 story high, will have a separate theme based on the mahabharta which will provide pilgrim and tourists an immersive experience of being in the Mahabharat war which lasted for 18 days. The project will cost Rs 200 cr or US$30 million at 2018 prices.

Mahabharata era statues 

Several tall statues of Mahabharata era figures are being installed in and around Jyotisar.

Gitopdesh - Gita Updesh statue 

A marble chariot statue of Krishna preaching to Arjuna marks the site at Jyotisar where mythological tradition says Bhagavad Gita was revealed to Arjuna.

Sri Krishna Virat Swaroop statue at Jyotisar 

In 2021 a 40 feet tall statue of Krishna, made of ashtadhatu (eight metals), was installed at the cost of INR10 crore (INR100 million or US130,000 at 2021 prices) at Jyotisar. The 40 ft high statue on a 10 ft plinth. which with landscaping will cost Rs. 10 crore. The statue was designed by the sculptor Ram Vanji Sutar, who also designed the 182-metre Statue of Unity of Sardar Patel in Gujarat and Ram Janmabhoomi temple. The statue has nine heads, including Krishna, Shiva, Ganesha, Narsimha avatara of Vishnu, Sugriva, Hanumana, Parshurama, and Agni Deva (The fire god), which will be covered with a canopy in the form of Sheshnaga.

Abhimanyu Chakravyūha statue at Abhimanyupur 

A 18-ft tall statue of Abhimanyu at Abhimanyupur, with a chariot wheel carried in both hands above his head depicting his stance during he Chakravyūha battle of mahabharta war, is installed at Abhimanyupur at the place where he was killed. It is installed by the Kurukshetra Development Board at a cost of Rs 24 lakh in 2020. This will be part of 8 acre park housing the statue and a  Chakravyūha formation.

Bhishama Deathbed and Arjuna's Banganga statue at Narkatari 

At Narkatari, between Jyotisar and Kurukshetra city, 2 statues will be installed - Arjuna and "Bhishama’s sarsaiya (Bhishma’s deathbed). "Arjuna’s Banganga" statue is 9-ft tall is depicted in the posture of him shooting an arrow to bring out the underground holy spring water for the thirsty Bhishma. Whereas, Bhishma's statue is depicted lying on a 10-ft long death bed made of arrows. It will cost Rs 32 lakh.

Pipli-Jyotisar Sarasvati riverfront project 

This entails broadening of the Sarasvati River, a sacred river mentioned in the sacred Hindu text Rigveda, from Pipli to Jyotisar, banks of river will be beautified, tourist cruises and boats from Pipli to Jyotisar tirtha will be operated. As Sarasvati River has been made perennial, it will be widened to enhance the flow of water and to utilise the channel for heritage, tourism and recreational activities. The length of Sarasvati's channel from Pipli on NH-44 in the northeast of Kurukshetra city to Sutlej Yamuna link canal (SYL canal) immediate east of Jyotisar is 21 km (70,000 ft) long. This narrowing of the river hampers flow of water and causes flooding in the inhabited areas in the northern part of Kurukshetra city. The narrowing of river is caused by the illegal encroachments by people. In March 2021, people were asked to remove the encroachments, after which legal notices will be sent to the remaining illegal encroachers. After the encroachment has been removed, the river will be widened, which will also prevent flooding.

The river receives 1,000 cusecs at Pipli during rainy season, but downstream only 200 cusecs water could flow due to encroachments. A minimum 70 ft wide channel is needed for the smooth flow. Hence, river will be widened after removing encroachments.

In addition to boating, there will be series of ghats, open air gym and cafeteria, etc. Initially boating will be started from Pipli to Kheri Markanda village, which will be later extended till Jyotisar after the widening of Sarasvati river.

 Current status

The 18 month long construction project commenced on 21 June 2018 with target completion by December 2019. However, the project was delayed for various reason including covid, and now it is scheduled to be completed by November 2021. As of August 2021, according to the officials the Administrative Block and Building No 4 are already complete, remaining work is 85% complete. However, ground report by new reports estimate only 50% work is complete, subsequently government officials have assured completion by Nov 2021.

 Religious observance 

 Kurukshetra Prasadam - Channa laddu speciality prasadam 

Just like Mathura peda as prasāda (consecrated food offered as blessing) is a specialty of Braj Krishna circuit in Mathura area, the sweet laddu made from the roasted channa (Indian chickpea) will be used as the geo-specialty food prasāda of various tirthas within 48 kos kurukshetra prikarma. This will be called Kurukshetra Prasadam. Compared to other sweets such as barfi or peda, the laddu does not spoil easily and has a longer shelf life at room temperature. Kurukshetra Development Board (KDB) has advised all the sweet shops if any tourist or pilgrim asks for prasad then only chana laddoo must be given. KDB will open 5 shops of its own to sell channa laddu as Kurukshetra Prasadam.

 Gita International Festival and Gita Deepotsav 

Jyotisar is one of the important site where the Gita International Festival is held every year in December. This also entails a Gita Deepotsav' (Gita festival of lights) during which hundreds of thousands of traditional earthen diya lamps are lit on the banks of Brahma Sarovar, Sannihit Sarovar and Jyotisar Sarovar. For example, 300,000 lamps were lit in December 2020.

See also

 Hindu pilgrimage sites in India
 List of Hindu temples
 Religious tourism in India

References

External links 
District Kurukshetra, Haryana, India
http://www.thedivineindia.com/jyotisar/5902

 
Hindu temples in Haryana
Vishnu temples
Kurukshetra
Hindu pilgrimage sites in India
Mahabharata
48 kos parikrama of Kurukshetra
Tourist attractions in Kurukshetra district